Lac du Verney is an artificial reservoir in the department of Isère, in the Rhône-Alpes of France. It serves as the lower reservoir for the Grand'Maison Dam pumped-storage scheme.

Neighbouring lakeside communities include Oz and Allemond.

Since 2006 it has hosted the opening swim of the Alpe d'Huez Triathlon.

Reservoirs in France
Dams in France
Lakes of Isère